Feralia is a genus of moths of the family Noctuidae. The genus was erected by Augustus Radcliffe Grote in 1874.

Species
 Feralia comstocki (Grote, 1874) – Comstock's sallow
 Feralia deceptiva McDunnough, 1920
 Feralia februalis Grote, 1874
 Feralia jocosa (Guenée, 1852) – jocose sallow
 Feralia major J. B. Smith, 1890 – major sallow
 Feralia meadowsi Buckett, 1967, [1968]
 Feralia sauberi (Graeser, 1892)

References

Psaphidinae